The 2020 ARCA Menards Series season was the 68th season of the ARCA Menards Series. It began on February 8 with the Lucas Oil 200 at Daytona International Speedway and ended on October 16 with the Speediatrics 150 at Kansas Speedway. 2020 was the first season that the series was sanctioned by NASCAR.

Bret Holmes won the drivers championship, his first in the series.

When the season was put on hold due to the COVID-19 pandemic, drivers from all NASCAR series, including a few ARCA drivers, participated in the inaugural eNASCAR iRacing Pro Invitational Series during that time.

Teams and drivers

Complete schedule

Limited schedule

Notes

Changes

Teams
 On November 20, 2019, it was announced that longtime East Series team Rev Racing would run in the ARCA Series for the first time, fielding two cars during Sioux Chief Showdown races.
 On December 17, 2019, DGR-Crosley announced an expansion to a full-time ARCA effort, a step up from previous part-time schedules. They had previously only run part-time in the series with their No. 54 in both 2018 and 2019 as well as the No. 4 in 2019.
 On May 9, 2020, KBR Development announced that the team closed. The team fielded an entry for David Gravel in one of two 2020 races that occurred before the team's closure.

Drivers
 On November 14, 2019, it was announced that 2019 series champion Christian Eckes would move up to the Truck Series full-time for Kyle Busch Motorsports starting in 2020.
 On November 20, 2019, it was announced that Chase Cabre and Nick Sanchez would drive two cars for Rev Racing in the Sioux Chief Showdown races.
 On December 10, 2019, it was announced that 2019 part-time driver Ty Majeski would compete full-time in the NASCAR Gander RV & Outdoors Truck Series in 2020.
 On December 17, 2019, Hailie Deegan announced a full-season Rookie of the Year campaign with DGR-Crosley in 2020, moving over from  a part-time schedule with Venturini Motorsports in 2019.
 On December 18, 2019, it was announced that Drew Dollar would run a full schedule for Venturini, moving over from a part-time schedule with DGR-Crosley in 2019.
 On December 18, 2019, it was announced that Taylor Gray would make his debut and run all races he was eligible for after his 15th birthday, running with DGR-Crosley.
 On December 20, 2019, it was announced that Ryan Repko would drive the No. 20 for Venturini Motorsports in five races, sharing the car with Chandler Smith.
 On December 23, 2019, it was announced that Tim Richmond, who drove most of the season for Wayne Peterson Racing in 2019, would run full-time for the team in 2020. Richmond later scaled back to a part-time schedule for the team.
 On January 2, 2020, Bobby Gerhart announced his exit as a driver from the series following a heart attack.
 On January 5, 2020, Travis Braden revealed that he would not run full-time in the series in 2020 after driving the No. 27 for RFMS Racing for the last two years, instead focusing on late model racing.
 Thad Moffitt switched teams for his part-time schedule, moving from Empire Racing in 2019 to DGR-Crosley in 2020.
 On January 10, 2020, it was announced that World of Outlaws driver David Gravel would run some ARCA races, including Daytona, in the No. 28 for KBR Development in addition to competing in the Truck Series part-time for GMS Racing this season.
 On January 16, 2020, it was announced that Corey Heim signed with Venturini Motorsports for a limited schedule in 2020; Heim raced with Chad Bryant Racing in 2019.
 On January 18, 2020, Scott Melton announced he was scaling back his schedule for 2020 compared to 2019.

Crew chiefs
 On December 18, 2019, it was announced that Shannon Rursch would be the crew chief of the No. 15 Venturini team, replacing Kevin Reed. In 2019, Rursch crew chiefed Venturini's No. 25 car. On January 23, 2020, it was announced that Reed would be the crew chief of the Venturini Motorsports No. 25 car, making it a crew chief swap with Rursch.

Manufacturers
 On December 11, 2019, DGR-Crosley announced that they would be switching from Toyota to Ford beginning in 2020.

Rule changes
ARCA adopted the current NASCAR points system after using the 1975-2010 NASCAR points system up until 2019. Additionally, steel-bodied cars were phased out entirely in favor of composite-bodied cars.

Schedule
The complete schedule was released on October 10, 2019. That came after a soft reveal of some Sioux Chief Showdown tracks on October 2. 

 Races highlighted in gold are combination events with the ARCA Menards Series East.

The season was paused from March to June due to the COVID-19 pandemic. A number of races were cancelled, rescheduled, or shifted to other tracks as a result of the pandemic.

Broadcasting
Fox and MAVTV continued to share broadcasting rights to the schedule, consistent with previous years.

Results and standings

Races

Drivers' championship

Note: The pole winner also receives 1 bonus point, similar to the previous ARCA points system used until 2019 and unlike NASCAR.

(key) Bold – Pole position awarded by time. Italics – Pole position set by final practice results or rainout. * – Most laps led.

See also
 2020 NASCAR Cup Series
 2020 NASCAR Xfinity Series
 2020 NASCAR Gander RV & Outdoors Truck Series
 2020 ARCA Menards Series East
 2020 ARCA Menards Series West
 2020 NASCAR Whelen Modified Tour
 2020 NASCAR Pinty's Series
 2020 NASCAR Whelen Euro Series
 2020 eNASCAR iRacing Pro Invitational Series
 2020 EuroNASCAR Esports Series

References

External links
 Official website

ARCA Menards Series seasons
Arca Menards Series
Arca Menards Series